In mathematics, specifically real analysis and functional analysis, the Kirszbraun theorem states that if  is a subset of some Hilbert space , and  is another Hilbert space, and 

is a Lipschitz-continuous map, then there is a Lipschitz-continuous map 

The version for Hilbert spaces can for example be found in (Schwartz 1969, p. 21). If  is a separable space (in particular, if it is a Euclidean space) the result is true in Zermelo–Fraenkel set theory;  for the fully general case, it appears to need some form of the axiom of choice;  the Boolean prime ideal theorem is known to be sufficient.

The proof of the theorem uses geometric features of Hilbert spaces; the corresponding statement for Banach spaces is not true in general, not even for finite-dimensional Banach spaces. More generally, the theorem fails for  equipped with any  norm (Schwartz 1969, p. 20).

Explicit formulas 

In general, an extension can also be written for -valued functions as  where   and conv(g) is the lower convex envelope of g.

History

The theorem was proved by Mojżesz David Kirszbraun, and later it was reproved by Frederick Valentine, who first proved it for the Euclidean plane. Sometimes this theorem is also called Kirszbraun–Valentine theorem.

References

External links
 Kirszbraun theorem at Encyclopedia of Mathematics.

Lipschitz maps
Metric geometry
Theorems in real analysis
Theorems in functional analysis
Hilbert space